Walter Kenneth Robinson (born March 5, 1908 - date of death unknown), nicknamed "Skin Down", was an American Negro league infielder who played between 1937 and 1944. 

A native of Fernandina Beach, Florida, Robinson made his Negro leagues debut in 1937 with the Jacksonville Red Caps. He played with the club through 1942, as it moved to Cleveland and back to Jacksonville. Robinson played for the Atlanta Black Crackers and New York Black Yankees in 1943, and returned to finish his career in Jacksonville in 1944.

References

External links
 and Baseball-Reference Black Baseball stats and Seamheads

1908 births

Year of death missing
Atlanta Black Crackers players
Cleveland Bears players
Jacksonville Red Caps players
New York Black Yankees players
Baseball players from Florida
People from Fernandina Beach, Florida
Baseball infielders